Gigantatypus is an extinct late Maastrichtian sea turtle that lived in the southern regions of the Tethys Ocean about  off the north eastern margins of Cretaceous Africa immediately before the Cretaceous–Paleogene extinction events . Fossil remains of Gigantatypus are so far only represented in sediments from Jordan. Although Gigantatypus apparently did not survive the K/T boundary, which also was the fate of other gigantic marine turtles such as protostegids, other genera of Cheloniidae, though significantly smaller in size survived the mass extinction and continued on until the present day.

References

Late Cretaceous reptiles of Africa
Cheloniidae
Late Cretaceous turtles
Monotypic prehistoric reptile genera
Extinct turtles
Prehistoric turtle genera